is a mountain in the Kitami Mountains. It is located on the border of Nishiokoppe, Shimokawa, and Takinoue, Hokkaidō, Japan.

References
 Geographical Survey Institute

Mountains of Hokkaido